was a department store in Amsterdam, The Netherlands, founded in 1740  which closed in 2013.

The store was founded by Mozes Samuels in the Jodenbreestraat, he sold his company to his three sons in 1794.  had the right to display the Dutch royal coat of arms with the legend 'By Royal Warrant Purveyor to the Royal Household' since 1815. To celebrate its 150th anniversary in 1890 the store moved to a new location on the Leidsestraat. After which it was located from 1908 to 2012 on Keizersgracht 455 corner with the Leidsestraat.

One of the first designers was Paul Bromberg (1893-1949), he became famous as an author  and promoter of Decorative Arts and Interior Design. The distinctive cupola on the store's roof was built in the 1930s and designed by Dutch artist Gerrit T. Rietveld. Metz & Co celebrated its 250th anniversary in 1990 by launching its own fragrance.

The store moved to smaller premises in 2012 for only one year, and was subsequently closed in March 2013.

External links

winkelstories.com

1740 establishments in the Dutch Republic
Department stores of the Netherlands
Shops in Amsterdam
History of Amsterdam
Defunct department stores
18th-century architecture in the Netherlands